Norwalk Community College (NCC), formerly Norwalk State Technical College and Norwalk Community-Technical College, is a public community college in Norwalk, Connecticut. It is the third-largest of the twelve colleges in the Connecticut State Colleges & Universities system (CSCU) system. The school, which has an open admissions policy, offers 45 associate degree and 26 certificate programs.

NCC has about 6,200 full- and part-time students in credit programs and about 5,700 students in noncredit programs. A commuter school with no dormitories, the college's primary service area includes ten towns in southwest Fairfield County. Housatonic Community College in Bridgeport, Gateway Community College in New Haven and North Haven, and Naugatuck Valley Community College in Waterbury  are the nearest of the state's other community colleges.

Along with certificates, the college grants the Associate in Arts, Associate in Science, and Associate in Applied Science degrees. Graduates of NCC are eligible for articulated admission to the Connecticut state university system and the University of Connecticut. A notable example of this is P-Tech Norwalk, which allows high school students to gain college credits through NCC with dual enrollment.

History
Norwalk Community College and Norwalk State Technical College were each founded in 1961. In 1992, the colleges merged to become "Norwalk Community-Technical College." In October 1999 the name format "community college" was approved for all state community colleges by the Board of Trustees of the Connecticut Community-Technical Colleges.

In 2009, the college graduated more than 700 students. More than 25 percent of the Class of 2009 graduated from high schools outside the United States.

Academics
The William H. Schwab Center for Information Technology opened in the fall of 2003. The $30 million facility supports programs that prepare students to enter high-technology jobs and serves as a workforce training center. The facility features technology classrooms, laboratories, a video conferencing center, and a "Security Institute and Degree Program", which, according to the 2004–2006 school catalogue, is "the only undergraduate computer security degree program in the nation that fully articulates with four-year degree programs." However, this is no longer the case.

The college has an Honors program, Interdisciplinary Studies courses, Professional and Extended Studies programs, a "Business and Professional Development Center", and a "Workforce Education Institute".  The college also has Nursing, Child Care Development, and English as a Second Language programs.

Accreditation
The college is accredited by the New England Commission of Higher Education and approved by the Connecticut Board of Governors for Higher Education. In addition, some individual programs are accredited by national professional associations. Examples include the Legal Assistant, Nursing, Respiratory Care, and Engineering Technology curricula.

Campus
The college is located on a  campus on Richards Avenue in West Norwalk, north of U.S. Route 1 and Interstate 95. The campus has two  buildings, one on each side of the street. Classes are offered in both buildings.

East Campus
The "East Campus" building contains general classrooms, the library, nursing and computer laboratories, the language lab, art classrooms, administrative and faculty offices, the 298-seat PepsiCo Theater, a broadcast television studio, the Child Development Laboratory School, an art gallery, and the college bookstore.

West Campus
The "West Campus" building houses the William H. Schwab Center for Information Technology, science labs, general classrooms, the Culinary Arts Laboratory, dining room, engineering technology labs, faculty offices, academic center, Developmental Studies Center, gymnasium, fitness center, and cafeteria.

Satellite Campus
A satellite campus is located at the Rippowam Center in Stamford, and some classes are offered on-line. The college has a satellite Nursing Program at Gateway Community College in New Haven.

Everett I.L. Baker Library
The Everett I.L. Baker Library in the East Campus building has 60,000 books, periodicals and newspapers, along with audiovisual materials and computers for student use.

Student life
Norwalk Community College has over 40 active clubs. The major ones are Student Government, Alpha Iota Nu (a chapter of the Phi Theta Kappa, an academic honor society for two-year colleges., a student newspaper, The Voice, a Service Learning Club, and United Nations Club.

Notable alumni
Érik Bédard - Major league baseball pitcher, attended the school and led the baseball program to the Junior College World Series.
Matthew Berry, current writer for ESPN.com and senior director of fantasy sports of ESPN.
Michael Fedele, Lieutenant Governor of Connecticut.
Richard Moccia, Mayor of Norwalk, graduated in 1970.
Kenton Clarke, CEO, Computer Consulting Associates International Inc., graduated Norwalk Technical College in Computer Science, 1972

Notes

External links
Official website

Community colleges in Connecticut
Buildings and structures in Norwalk, Connecticut
Educational institutions established in 1961
Universities and colleges in Fairfield County, Connecticut
Tourist attractions in Norwalk, Connecticut
1961 establishments in Connecticut